Archaeocyon ("ancient dog") is an extinct genus of  the Borophaginae subfamily of canids native to North America. Species of Archaeocyon are among the earliest known borophagines, although a species of Otarocyon has a slightly earlier first appearance. Fossils have been found across the northern Great Plains and along the west coast of North America.

Archaeocyon was a comparatively small and unspecialized dog. Its dentition (teeth) suggests a slightly more hypocarnivorous (omnivorous) diet than the otherwise similar Hesperocyon. The skeleton is also generalized, lacking specializations for running and retaining a plantigrade foot posture.

A few derived features of the dentition support a relationship to Borophaginae and Caninae (the subfamily that includes living canids), rather than to the basal canid subfamily Hesperocyoninae. The temporal position of Archaeocyon suggests an affinity to borophagines because the first members of Caninae appear substantially earlier.

Species
Three species of Archaeocyon have been described. The two earlier species, A. pavidus and A. leptodus, differ primarily in size, with A. leptodus being larger. The third species, A. falkenbachi, is the size of A. leptodus and differs from other Archaeocyon species in having a shorter, broader skull.

References 

Borophagines
Oligocene canids
Oligocene mammals of North America
Prehistoric carnivoran genera
Fossil taxa described in 1999